The Men's 1 km time trial at the 2014 Commonwealth Games, was part of the cycling programme, which took place on 26 July 2014.

Results

References

Men's 1 km time trial
Cycling at the Commonwealth Games – Men's 1 km time trial